Ayaz is a village in the Yenişehir district of Bursa Province in Turkey.

References

Villages in Yenişehir District, Bursa